Ḥiwi al-Balkhi (9th century) (also Hiwwi or Chivi) was an exegete and Biblical critic of the last quarter of the ninth century born in Balkh, Khorasan (modern Afghanistan). Some claim that he was a member of the ancient Bukharan Jewish community of Central Asia.

Criticism of the Bible
Hiwi was the author of a work in which he offered two hundred objections to the divine origin of the Bible. Ḥiwi's critical views were widely read, and it is said that his contemporary Saadia Gaon found in Babylonia, in the district of Sura, some school-masters who, in teaching children, used elementary text-books which were based upon Ḥiwi's criticisms. Saadia not only prohibited the use of these books, but combated Ḥiwi's arguments in a work entitled Kitab al-Rudd ala Ḥiwi al-Balkhi. Both Saadia's and Ḥiwi's books are lost.

Ḥiwi's book seems to have been one of the most important contributions to skeptical Jewish literature. Only a few of his objections are preserved, in quotations by other authors. In this way it became known that Ḥiwi raised the question why God preferred to live among unclean mankind instead of living among the clean angels (Judah ben Barzillai), and why He required sacrifices and showbread if He did not eat them, and candles when He did not need light. Another objection of his was based on the claim that God broke a promise which He had made under oath. All these objections are preserved in Saadia's Kitab al-Amanat, among twelve other objections of a similar kind, most of which are supposed to have originated with Ḥiwi. They point out several discrepancies in the Scriptures, and infer therefrom a non-divine authorship. Ḥiwi even objected to the teaching of the unity of God, and referred to Deuteronomy xxxii. 9. In this case, as in several others, Saadia combats Ḥiwi without mentioning his name.

Some others of Ḥiwi's views are preserved in Ibn Ezra's commentary on the Pentateuch. The passing of the Israelites through the Red Sea Ḥiwi explained by the natural phenomenon of the ebb-tide; and the words "the skin of his [Moses'] face shone" ("ḳaran," literally, "cast horns" or "rays"; Exodus xxxiv. 29) he explained as referring to the dryness of his skin in consequence of long fasting (see Ibn Ezra on the passage in Exodus). Ḥiwi further explained the manna as a naturally occurring phenomenon (Ibn Ezra to Ex. xvi. 13).

These few instances of Ḥiwi's criticisms are sufficient to show his skeptical and irreverent spirit, the cause of which D. Kaufmann traced back to anti-Jewish polemical Pahlavi literature.  also indicates that all of these Biblical difficulties can be traced to Manichaean dualist views.  Karaites and Rabbinites agreed in denouncing Ḥiwi as a heretic. His real surname, "Al-Balkhi," is correctly preserved in one instance only; in all others it is changed into "Al-Kalbi" (אל-כלבי = "the dog-like").

The geniza fragment
In Jewish Quarterly Review (1901) xiii. 358 et seq. Schechter has published one of the most interesting genizah fragments, containing a long series of critical remarks on the Bible which, as Schechter demonstrates, recall very vividly Ḥiwi's method of argumentation. Continuing his essay, Schechter gives also the reasons which speak against the presumption that Ḥiwi was the author of the fragments; he comes to the conclusion, however, that they at least emanated from the school of Ḥiwi.  Below are some of Schechter's remarks (footnotes omitted).  The Bibliography at the bottom of this page provides a link to the full source.

Bibliography
 
The JE cites the following sources:
Steinschneider, Jewish Literature, p. 119;
Julius Fürst, in Orient, Lit. x. 94;
Heinrich Grätz, Gesch. v. 261 et seq., 464 et seq.;
Guttmann, in Monatsschrift, xxviii. 260, 289;
A. Harkavy, Meassef Niddaḥim, i., No. 1;
idem, Sefer ha-Galui, pp. 146 et seq., 176;
Israelsohn, in R. E. J. xvii. 310;
D. Kaufmann, ib. xxii. 287;
Joseph Derenbourg, ib. xxv. 249;
Winter and Wünsche, Die Jüdische Litteratur, ii. 242 et seq.;
Bacher, Bibelexegese der Jüdischen Religionsphilosophen, p. 39.
.
.

Notes

External links
 Hiwi the Heretic

Jewish skeptics
Jewish biblical scholars
9th-century Jews
People from Balkh